The Bolivian warbling finch (Poospiza boliviana) is a species of bird in the family Thraupidae.
It is found in Argentina and Bolivia.
Its natural habitat is subtropical or tropical high-altitude shrubland.

References

Bolivian warbling finch
Birds of the Bolivian Andes
Bolivian warbling finch
Taxonomy articles created by Polbot